A kolbar or kolber or cross-border labor is a worker who is employed to carry goods on his/her back across the borders of Iran, Iraq, Syria and Turkey legally or illegally. Most kolbars live in Iranian Kurdistan, where the Kurdish provinces are among the poorest in the country. Kolbars also live in Turkish Kurdistan and to a lesser extent Iraqi Kurdistan. Since kolbar work is mostly considered illegal, kolbar workers have no insurance, retirement plans and unions. Among the kolbars are highly educated young people, who have no job because of high unemployment in Kurdish provinces. According to Iranian statistics, only in the Kurdistan Province more than twenty thousand people depend on being a kolbar for sustenance. The phenomenon of kolbari is tied to the de-development of the Kurdistan region, Iran.

Etymology
The word kolbar is a Kurdish word, which literally means one who carries a load.

Children and Women as Kolbar
This occupation has existed since the Pahlavi dynasty. However, since this occupation has been declared illegal by the Iranian government, many people are killed each year by shots fired by the Iranian Revolutionary Guard border troops Often, however, many Kolbars freeze to death due to the cold or die from falling off mountains

The proportion of women, children and people with an academic degree has increased in recent years as a result of the economic crisis in the region. Since there is no clear definition of Kolbar so far, they cannot be defended in legal matters. In recent years, the Iranian parliament has tried several times to recognize the profession of Kolbari as a legal activity and to push through a bill for this, but this has repeatedly failed.

Day of the Kolbar
November 2nd is Kolbar Day. The reason for this is that every year at this time, due to the high security measures on the occasion of the hostage-taking of Tehran (on 4 November 1979), a particularly large number of Kolbar die.

Kolbar in Media

The situation and working conditions of Kolbar are rarely discussed in the media, usually only in the form of short reports on regional websites such as Telegram about deaths of Kolbar.
The Kolbar work under very harsh conditions
In the film Time of the Drunken Horses by the film director Bahman Ghobadi, brief insights into the everyday life of the Kolbar are given. [6] But the term Kolbar is also mentioned sporadically in the books and newspapers, such as a few articles from the Kurdish afterthought side "Rudaw"[7]

Killing kolbars
In both Iran and Turkey many young male and female kolbars have been shot dead by government forces. In many cases crossing the border is against the law, and the kolbars are shot.

Job creation for kolbars
The Barakat Foundation has launched an event called "Kak Barakat" (Job Creation for kolbars in Border Provinces) to create a job for kolbars by collecting plans from entrepreneurs and ideators. Thus, 3,000 projects are to be collected by kolbars, academic communities, and entrepreneurs with the participation of the Barakat Foundation in the three provinces of Kermanshah, West Azerbaijan, and Kurdistan, and nearly 10,000 direct and indirect job opportunities will be created. It is said that most of the jobs created in the form of this event are small and home.

References

discrimination in Iran